Diathermal or diathermic may refer to:

Related to diathermy, e.g., diathermic therapy
Diathermal wall, in thermodynamics, allowing (only) heat transfer
Diathermal oil, oil used for heat transfer